Iwan Spekenbrink (born 15 February 1976) is a Dutch cycling manager, who has been the team manager of UCI WorldTeam  since the team's creation in 2005. He is also the president of the AIGCP, which he was elected to in 2015.

He competed as a cyclist as a junior before moving onto working as a team manager.

References

Dutch sports coaches
Living people
1976 births
Directeur sportifs
Team DSM (men's team)